Tazehnab or Tazeh Nab, also rendered as Taznab or Tazenab, may refer to:
 Tazehnab-e Mohammad Baqer
 Tazehnab-e Olya
 Tazehnab-e Sofla
 Tazehnab-e Vosta